The Return!!! (of the Psychopath) is the sixth album released by rapper, Ganxsta NIP. It was released on November 11, 2003 through Rest In Peace / Black Market Records and featured production from 151, Dope E, J.B. Money and K-Rino. The entire project was headed by Mars.

Track listing
"Intro" 
"The Return!!!" 
"Fight & Fuck 2 Much" (skit)
"Any M-Fucker" (Feat. Dope-E)
"In the Mix" 
"South Park" 
"Psych' Ballin'" 
"Born Genius" 
"Fed Up!!" 
"Originator" 
"Regime Change" (Feat. Dope-E, Lil' Lo)
"Purchase a Ticket" 
"Do You Like Scary Movies?" 
"Insect Warground" 
"Murderer" 
"Bussin' Rounds" (Feat. A.C. Chill, DBX, Greek, K-Rino)

Personnel
Executive Producer - Cedric Singleton

2003 albums
Psychopathy
Horrorcore albums